SS Juan Casiano was a Mexican Tanker that was lost during a gale in the Atlantic Ocean  off Savannah, Georgia, United States on 19 October 1944 while she was travelling from Tampico, Mexico to New York City, New York, United States.

Construction 
Juan Casiano was built at the William Doxford & Sons Ltd. shipyard in Sunderland, United Kingdom in October 1919. Where she was launched and completed that same year. The ship could generate 619 n.h.p. with a speed of 10 knots.

Pre-War Career and 1919 Incident 
Only one month after being built, Juan Casiano (then named Linerton) had an engine breakdown as she was travelling from the River Tyne to Baltimore, Maryland, United States on 9 November 1919. This resulted in her running aground near South Shields with no reported fatalities and she ultimately broke in two pieces. The bow was refloated on 6 April 1920 and the stern on 18 May 1920 after which both parts were towed to Rotterdam, The Netherlands to be converted into a tanker under a new owner and under the new name Radix.

She changed hands once more before being sold to a new German owner Johann Haltermann in July 1939 which was accompanied by another name change Tine Asmussen. When World War II broke out a few months later, the newly acquired ship had the possibility of becoming targeted by Allied forces. This never became the case as she was seized by Mexico in 1940 and renamed Juan Casiano to serve under her new owner Petroleos Mexicanos S. A. (Mexican Government) for the upcoming four years.

Sinking 
Juan Casiano was travelling from Tampico, Mexico to New York City, New York, United States when on 19 October 1944, she became trapped in a gale in the Atlantic Ocean.

Wreck 

References

1919 ships
Ships built on the River Wear
World War II shipwrecks in the Atlantic Ocean
Tankers
Steamships of Mexico
Maritime incidents in October 1944
Maritime incidents in 1919
Ships lost with all hands